Cedric Bessi (born 28 November 1990) is a Monégasque judoka.

Bessi was introduced to judo by his father Eric-Louis Bessi, who had become the first judoka to compete for Monaco at the Olympic Games, doing so in 1984 and 1988, as well as serving as the president of the executive committee of the Monaco Judo Federation. Bessi was selected to compete at the delayed 2020 Summer Games in Tokyo, one of only six athletes from the principality of Monaco to compete. They were given a personal send off at the Yacht Club de Monaco by Albert II, Prince of Monaco.

References

1990 births
Living people
Monegasque male judoka
Olympic judoka of Monaco
Judoka at the 2020 Summer Olympics
European Games competitors for Monaco
Judoka at the 2015 European Games
Judoka at the 2019 European Games
Competitors at the 2013 Mediterranean Games
Competitors at the 2018 Mediterranean Games